Crazy Eddie may refer to:
Crazy Eddie, a chain of electronics stores
Crazy Eddie, a mythical alien character in the 1974 novel The Mote in God's Eye
Crazy Eddie, a fictional character, Eddie Nambulous, from First Wave
Crazy Eddie Muldoon, a character in Patrick F. McManus's semi-autobiographical books about his childhood